Stanca may refer to:

Stanca, a village in Stăncuța Commune, Romania
Stanca Act, a 2004 Italian law promoting information technology accessibility
Doamna Stanca, Princess of Wallachia
Doamna Stanca National College (disambiguation), two education institutions in Romania

Persons with the surname Stanca
Ionela Stanca, Romanian handball player
Lucio Stanca, Italian Minister of Innovations during the second cabinet of Berlusconi
Radu Stanca, Romanian poet, playwright, theatre director, theatre critic and theoretician
Răzvan Stanca, Romanian football player

See also 
Stânca (disambiguation)
Stanča (disambiguation)